Marcel Vertès (born Marcell Vértes, 10 August 1895 – 31 October 1961) was a French costume designer and illustrator of Hungarian-Jewish origins. He won two Academy Awards (Best Art Direction and Best Costume Design) for his work on the 1952 film Moulin Rouge.

Vertès is also responsible for the original murals in the Café Carlyle in the Carlyle Hotel in New York City, New York and for those in the Peacock Alley in the Waldorf Astoria Hotel in New York.

Selected filmography
 Moulin Rouge (1952)

References

External links

1895 births
1961 deaths
Hungarian Jews
French costume designers
Hungarian costume designers
Jewish illustrators
Set decorators
Best Art Direction Academy Award winners
French art directors
Hungarian art directors
Best Costume Design Academy Award winners
Artists from Budapest